Honey Creek is a common geographical place name given to multiple locales, structures and bodies of water within the U.S. state of Texas.  Several counties have more than one Honey Creek place name within their boundaries. Comal County has six Honey Creek place names that include Honey Creek State Natural Area and the Honey Creek State Natural Area Trail, and also Honey Creek Spring, the community of Honey Creek, the Honey Creek stream, and Honey Creek Cemetery.  In addition to Comal, the counties of Bandera, Hamilton and Llano have cemeteries with that name.. Bandera, Kerr and Mason counties each have a Honey Creek Ranch. In Mason County, the Honey Creek stream is an historic archaeological site. Hunt County has Honey Creek Church on its Honey Creek stream.

References

Geography of Texas